The 1992 Akron Zips football team represented Akron University in the 1992 NCAA Division I-A football season as members of the Mid-American Conference. They were led by seventh–year head coach Gerry Faust. The Zips played their home games at the Rubber Bowl in Akron, Ohio. They finished the season with a record of 7–3–1, 5–3 in MAC play to finish in a three-way tie for third place.

Schedule

References

Akron
Akron Zips football seasons
Akron Zips football